The Princeton International School of Mathematics and Science (PRISMS) is a coeducational, independent boarding and day school located in Princeton, New Jersey, United States. It provides STEM education to high school students in ninth through twelfth grades.

As of the 2021–22 school year, the school had an enrollment of 118 students with 24 classroom teachers, which is a student–teacher ratio of 5.6:1.

It was founded in 2013 by Jiang Bairong. Plans were announced to expand the school to 300 students, with $20 million committed to startup costs.

The school has  of land. The zoning from the American Boychoir School allowed for a maximum of 82 students, and nearby residents voiced opposition to the school's plans for expansion.

PRISMS is a sister school of the High School Affiliated to Renmin University of China. Students collaborate with their peers in China on research projects. The student body at PRISMS is 75% Chinese and is part of a larger influx of Chinese students into American private schools.

References

External links
Official website
Related information about the school

Boarding schools in New Jersey
Private high schools in Mercer County, New Jersey
Private middle schools in New Jersey
Schools in Princeton, New Jersey